Wind Gap (Pennsylvania Dutch: Gratdaal) is a borough in Northampton County, Pennsylvania. The population of Wind Gap was 2,820 at the 2020 census. Wind Gap is part of the Lehigh Valley metropolitan area, which had a population of 861,899 and was the 68th most populous metropolitan area in the U.S. as of the 2020 census.

Geography
Wind Gap is located at  (40.846429, -75.291631).

Transportation

Pennsylvania Route 33 and Pennsylvania Route 512 are the numbered highways passing through Wind Gap. PA 33 follows a north-south alignment across the southwestern corner of the borough. It has an interchange with PA 512 just southwest of the borough in Plainfield Township. PA 512 follows Broadway and Lehigh Avenue along a southwest-northeast alignment through the center of the borough.

Demographics

As of the census of 2000, there were 2,812 people, 1,221 households, and 765 families residing in the borough. The population density was 2,061.8 people per square mile (798.3/km2). There were 1,294 housing units at an average density of 948.8 per square mile (367.4/km2). The racial makeup of the borough was 97.62% White, 0.46% African American, 0.04% Native American, 0.68% Asian, 0.53% from other races, and 0.68% from two or more races. Hispanic or Latino of any race were 1.60% of the population.

There were 1,221 households, out of which 26.6% had children under the age of 18 living with them, 49.4% were married couples living together, 10.2% had a female householder with no husband present, and 37.3% were non-families. 30.9% of all households were made up of individuals, and 13.4% had someone living alone who was 65 years of age or older. The average household size was 2.25 and the average family size was 2.84.

In the borough, the population was spread out, with 20.8% under the age of 18, 7.5% from 18 to 24, 29.6% from 25 to 44, 22.8% from 45 to 64, and 19.2% who were 65 years of age or older. The median age was 39 years. For every 100 females there were 88.6 males. For every 100 females age 18 and over, there were 84.6 males. The median income for a household in the borough was $35,030, and the median income for a family was $46,681. Males had a median income of $36,735 versus $22,700 for females. The per capita income for the borough was $21,239. About 7.2% of families and 11.9% of the population were below the poverty line, including 20.3% of those under age 18 and 9.8% of those age 65 or over.

Public education
The borough is served by the Pen Argyl Area School District. Students in grades nine through 12 attend Pen Argyl Area High School in Pen Argyl.

References

1893 establishments in Pennsylvania
Boroughs in Northampton County, Pennsylvania
Boroughs in Pennsylvania
Populated places established in 1740